Borgognone is a surname. Notable people with the surname include:

Ambrogio Bergognone (1470–1523), Italian painter
Dirk Borgognone (born 1968), former National Football League placekicker
Guillaume Courtois (1628–1679), French painter active in Italy
Jacques Courtois (1621–1676), French painter active in Italy

Italian-language surnames